Latridiinae is a subfamily of tiny, little-known beetles in the family Latridiidae.

Genera
Latridiinae contains the following genera:
 Adistemia Fall, 1899
 Besuchetia Dajoz, 1975
 Cartodere C. G. Thomson, 1859
 Dicastria Dajoz, 1967
 Dienerella Reitter, 1911
 Enicmus C. G. Thomson, 1859
 Euchionellus Reitter, 1908
 Eufallia Mannerheim, 1900
 Eufalloides Hinton, 1941
 Herfordia Halstead, 1967
 Latridius Herbst, 1793
 Lithostygnus Broun, 1886
 Metophtalmoides Dajoz, 1967
 Metophthalmus Mannerheim, 1850
 Mumfordia Van Dyke, 1932
 Nalpaumia Dajoz, 1967
 Revelieria Perris, 1869
 Stephostethus Le Conte, 1878
 Thes Semenov, 1910

References

External links

Beetle subfamilies
Latridiidae